David Eric Biro (born 1964) is an American writer and physician.

Education and academic career

Biro was born in 1964, and grew up in Brooklyn, New York, where he attended Poly Prep with his three sisters. He received a BA in Classics from University of Pennsylvania.  He went on to receive an MD from Columbia University in 1991, and a DPhil in English Literature in 1993 from the University of Oxford.

Biro is an associate clinical professor of Dermatology and Medical Humanities at SUNY Downstate in Brooklyn, and a clinical assistant professor of Dermatology at the NYU Grossman School of Medicine.  He teaches general dermatology with a focus on skin cancer.

In the medical humanities, Biro's main areas of expertise are the expressibility of pain, the psychological dimensions of pain, illness narratives, and the patient experience.

Writing
In 1996, Biro discovered that he had a rare bone marrow disease, paroxysmal nocturnal hemoglobinuria.  He was treated by a bone marrow transplant from one of his sisters.  He wrote in 2000 about his experience as a patient, and how it changed his work as a physician, in his first book One Hundred Days: My Unexpected Journey from Doctor to Patient.  He also drew on this experience in his second book, The Language of Pain: Finding Words, Compassion, Relief, which discusses the use of language to express pain.

His first work of fiction, The Magnificent Dappled Sea, was published in 2020.  This was followed by a second novel in 2021.

Personal life
Biro married fashion executive Daniella Vitale in 1991.. The couple live in Manhattan with their sons.

Bibliography

Books

References

External links 
 

American male writers
21st-century American writers
American dermatologists
1964 births
Living people